The 1997–2002  Bolivian National Congress was a meeting of the Bolivian legislature composed of the Chamber of Senators and Chamber of Deputies. It met in La Paz from August 1997 to August 2002 during the presidencies of Hugo Banzer and Jorge Quiroga.

The Congress was elected as part of the general elections on 1 June 1997.

Congressional presidential ballot 
As no candidate reached the required popular vote majority, the newly elected Congress elected the president on 6 August.

Hugo Banzer of Nationalist Democratic Action (ADN) was elected with the support of Revolutionary Left Movement (MIR), Conscience of Fatherland (CONDEPA), and Solidarity Civic Unity (UCS). Juan Carlos Durán of the Revolutionary Nationalist Movement (MNR) received only the support of his own party. The United Left (IU) and the Free Bolivia Movement (MBL) abstained.

Leadership

National Congress 
 President: Jorge Quiroga (ADN), until 7 August 2001
 Luis Vasquez Villamor (MIR), from 7 August 2001

Chamber of Senators 
 President: Wálter Guiteras Denis (ADN), until August 1999
 Leopoldo Fernández (ADN), until August 2001
 Enrique Toro Tejada (ADN), from August 2001

Chamber of Deputies 
 President: Hormando Vaca Diez (MIR), until August 1998
Hugo Carvajal Donoso (MIR), until August 2000
Jaalil Melgar Mustafá (UCS), until August 2001
Luis Vasquez Villamor (MIR), from August 2001

Composition

Chamber of Senators 
1997–2002 members of the Chamber of Senators:

Chamber of Deputies 
1997–2002 members of the Chamber of Deputies:

Notes

References 

Political history of Bolivia
Members of the Plurinational Legislative Assembly